The 2009 Taça de Angola was the 28th edition of the Taça de Angola, the second most important and the top knock-out football club competition in Angola, following the Girabola. Primeiro de Agosto beat Sagrada Esperança 2–1 in the final, to secure its 3rd title.

The winner and the runner-up qualified to the CAF Confederation Cup. Sagrada who were supposed to participate as the runner-up, later declined to participate citing financial reasons, being replaced by Académica do Soyo.

Stadia and locations

Championship bracket

Provincial stage

Preliminary rounds

Round of 16

Quarter-finals

Semi-finals

Final

See also
 2009 Girabola
 2010 Angola Super Cup
 2010 CAF Confederation Cup
 Primeiro de Agosto players
 Sagrada Esperança players

External links
 Tournament profile at girabola.com
 Tournament profile at rsssf.com

References

Angola Cup
Taca de Angola
Taca de Angola